Ronald Jude Landry (May 30, 1943 – May 24, 2020) was an American lawyer and politician.

Landry was born in Lutcher, Louisiana and lived in Thibodaux, Louisiana. He went to Nicholls State University. He received his bachelor's and law degrees from Louisiana State University. Landry practiced law in LaPlace, Louisiana. Landry served in the Louisiana Senate from 1976 until 2000 and was a Democrat. He died in Mandeville, Louisiana.

Notes

1943 births
2020 deaths
People from LaPlace, Louisiana
People from Lutcher, Louisiana
Louisiana State University alumni
Nicholls State University alumni
Louisiana lawyers
Democratic Party Louisiana state senators
Louisiana State University Law Center alumni
20th-century American politicians